, son of Fuyuie, was kugyo or highest-ranking Japanese court noble of the Muromachi period (1336–1573). He held a regent position Kampaku from 1454 to 1455. Regent Masahira was his son.

References
 https://web.archive.org/web/20070927231943/http://nekhet.ddo.jp/people/japan/fstakatukasa.html (note: the source incorrectly notes that Fusahira is a son of Fuyumichi, while actually he is a son of Fuyuie as this article states.)

Year of birth missing
1472 deaths
Fujiwara clan
Takatsukasa family